(), also referred to as simply , abbreviated BD, is a Finland-Swedish academic male voice choir in Turku, Finland.

Overview
The choir was founded in 1937 and was directed by John Rosas until 1955. Rosas was succeeded by Gottfrid Gräsbeck, who was in turn succeeded by Ulf Långbacka in 1991.

The choir is known for its annual Christmas concerts around the first Sunday of Advent in the Turku Cathedral together with its Åbo Akademi University sister choir Florakören, and the Åbo Akademi University symphony orchestra Akademiska Orkestern. The choir also performs on 30 April every year to celebrate the coming of spring; these concerts have for many years been broadcast live on radio and TV.

The choir has toured abroad frequently, both on its own and together with Florakören, e.g. in Canada and the United States in 2005, in Norway in 2006, in Italy in 2007, in Poland in 2008, in France and Spain in 2009, in Austria in 2010, and in Japan in 2012, celebrating its 75th anniversary.

See also

External links
 Official web page
 Åbo Akademi University

University choirs
Boys' and men's choirs
Finnish choirs
Musical groups established in 1937
Finland Swedish